Chaplain Patrick James Ryan (December 12, 1902 – June 5, 1975) was an American major general who served as Chief of Chaplains of the United States Army from 1954 to 1958.

Biography
Ryan was born near Manannah Township, Minnesota, on December 12, 1902. He graduated from the College of St. Thomas and the Saint Paul Seminary School of Divinity and became an ordained Roman Catholic priest in 1927. He was later given the title of Monsignor by Pope Pius XII and the title of Prothonotary Apostolic by Pope Paul VI. Ryan died on June 5, 1975, in Washington, D.C.

Career
Ryan joined the United States Army in 1928. Early in his career, he was stationed at Fort Leavenworth, Fort Riley and the Walter Reed Army Medical Center, among other places. During World War II, he served in Morocco and Italy. Following the war, he served as Deputy Chief of Chaplains of the United States Army from 1946 to 1948 and from 1952 to 1954 with the rank of brigadier general. He would then serve as Chief of Chaplains of the United States Army with the rank of major general from 1954 until his retirement in 1958.

Awards he received include the Legion of Merit, the Army Distinguished Service Medal, the Bronze Star Medal, the Army Commendation Medal, the World War II Victory Medal, the Asiatic-Pacific Campaign Medal and the Navy Presidential Unit Citation with award star.

Awards and decorations

See also

References

1902 births
1975 deaths
United States Army generals
Chiefs of Chaplains of the United States Army
Deputy Chiefs of Chaplains of the United States Army
United States Army personnel of World War II
United States Army personnel of the Korean War
World War II chaplains
Korean War chaplains
Recipients of the Legion of Merit
Recipients of the Distinguished Service Medal (US Army)
University of St. Thomas (Minnesota) alumni
Saint Paul Seminary School of Divinity alumni
People from Meeker County, Minnesota
Catholics from Minnesota
20th-century American Roman Catholic priests
Military personnel from Minnesota